Falcone may refer to:

People with the surname Falcone
Achille Falcone (1570–1600), Italian composer
Aniello Falcone (1600–1665), Italian painter
Baldomero Falcone (b. 1944), Filipino business consultant and politician
Ben Falcone (b. 1973), American actor
Ben Falcone (rugby league) (b. 1988), Italian rugby league player
Don Falcone (b. 1958), American musician
Federico Falcone (b. 1988), Argentine footballer
Giovanni Falcone (1939–1992), Italian judge killed by the Mafia
Giulio Falcone (b. 1974), Italian footballer
Leonard Falcone (1899–1985), baritone horn/euphonium virtuoso
Luigi Falcone (b. 1992), Italian footballer
Marco Falcone (b. 1959), Italian fencer
Mario Falcone (b. 1988), English television personality
Pete Falcone (b. 1953), American baseball player
Philip Falcone, an American businessman
Pierre Falcone (b. 1954), French businessman
Roger Falcone, American physicist
Sonia Falcone (b. 1965), Bolivian painter and artist
Tom Falcone, drummer of the band Cute Is What We Aim For
Wladimiro Falcone, (b. 1995) Italian footballer

Fictional characters
 Falcone crime family (the Falcones), a DC comics crime family, see Carmine Falcone
Alberto Falcone, a DC comics character, son of Carmine Falcone in the Batman universe
Carmine Falcone, a DC comics character, a fictional mob boss in the Batman universe, father of Alberto Falcone and Mario Falcone; head of the Falcone crime family in the DC Universe
Kitrina Falcone, a DC comics character
Mario Falcone (DC Comics), a DC comics character
Sofia Falcone Gigante, a DC comics character
 Falcone crime family (the Falcones), from book series The Camorra Chronicles by author Cora Reilly
 Falcone crime family (the Falcones), from the 1986 action-comedy film Detective School Dropouts, of Bruno, Don, and Sonia Falcones
 Falcone crime family (the Falcones), from the video game Mafia II
Carlo Falcone, the don of the Falcone crime family in the video game Mafia II
Frankie Falcone, a fictional crime boss from the novel The Godfather
Mateo Falcone, the protagonist of a short story by Prosper Mérimée, later an opera of the same name
Zeke Falcone, a fictional character from the U.S. TV sitcom Zeke and Luther

Places
Falcone, Sicily, a city in the Province of Messina, Sicily
Falcone-Borsellino Airport, alternate name of the Palermo Airport (Italy), after Giovanni Falcone and Paolo Borsellino
 Morvillo Falcone High School, Brindisi, Italy; where the 2012 Morvillo Falcone school bombing happened
Monte Pian Falcone, a mountain in Italy
60183 Falcone, the asteroid Falcone, a main belt asteroid, the 60183rd asteroid registered

Entertainment
Falcone (TV series), a short-lived 2000 TV series addressing the experiences of FBI undercover agent, Joseph D. Pistone, whose story was also told in the film Donnie Brasco
Falcone (film), a 1999 telefilm
Leonard Falcone International Tuba and Euphonium Festival, amateur festival held at the Blue Lake Fine Arts Camp at Twin Lake, Michigan, United States
Mateo Falcone, a 1906–1907 opera by César Cui

See also

Mario Falcone (disambiguation)
 
Falconi (surname)
Falcon (disambiguation)
Falconer (disambiguation)
Falcones (disambiguation)
Falconet (disambiguation)
Falkner (disambiguation)
Faulkner (disambiguation)
Faulknor (disambiguation)
Fawkner (disambiguation)